The men's hammer throw event at the 2007 Asian Athletics Championships was held in Amman, Jordan on July 25.

Results

References
Final results

2007 Asian Athletics Championships
Hammer throw at the Asian Athletics Championships